Bob Izzard was an Australian rugby league footballer who played in the 1930s. He played for the North Sydney club of the New South Wales Rugby Football League premiership.

Playing career
Izzard made his first grade debut for North Sydney against Canterbury-Bankstown in round 1 of the 1935 season at North Sydney Oval.  His final game for Norths was in round 16 of the same year against Eastern Suburbs where North Sydney were thrashed 53–15 at the Sydney Cricket Ground.

References

Australian rugby league players
North Sydney Bears players
Year of birth missing
Year of death missing
Rugby league wingers
Rugby league players from Sydney